Music to Watch Girls By: The Very Best of Andy Williams is a compilation album by American pop singer Andy Williams that was released by Sony Music Entertainment in 2005. 

The compilation first appeared on the UK album chart on July 9 of that year and remained there for two weeks, peaking at number 50.

Track listing

 "Music to Watch Girls By" (Tony Velona, Sid Ramin) – 2:38
 "Can't Get Used to Losing You" (Jerome "Doc" Pomus, Mort Shuman) – 2:25
 "Moon River"  (Henry Mancini, Johnny Mercer) – 2:46
 "Can't Take My Eyes Off You" (Bob Crewe, Bob Gaudio) – 3:15
 "On the Street Where You Live"  (Alan Jay Lerner, Frederick Loewe) – 3:12
 "Up, Up and Away" (Jimmy Webb) – 2:36
 "House of Bamboo" (William Crompton, Norman Murrells) – 2:06
 "Happy Heart" (James Last, Jackie Rae) – 3:15
 "Born Free"  (Don Black, John Barry) – 2:27
 "Spooky" (Buddy Buie, James B. Cobb, Jr., Harry Middlebrooks, Mike Shapiro) – 3:18
 "The Impossible Dream (The Quest)"  (Joe Darion, Mitch Leigh) – 2:39
 "Unchained Melody" (Hy Zaret, Alex North) – 3:16
 "Can't Help Falling in Love" (Luigi Creatore, Hugo Peretti, George David Weiss) – 3:15
 "Somethin' Stupid" (C. Carson Parks) – 2:59
 "Raindrops Keep Fallin' on My Head"  (Burt Bacharach, Hal David) – 3:11
 "I Think I Love You" (Tony Romeo) – 2:42
 "The Look of Love"  (Bacharach, David) – 2:55
 "We've Only Just Begun" (Roger Nichols, Paul Williams) – 3:15
 "Aquarius/Let the Sunshine In"  (Galt MacDermot, James Rado, Gerome Ragni) – 3:51
 "It's So Easy" (Dor Lee, Dave Watkins) – 2:29
 "Wives and Lovers" (Bacharach, David) – 2:20
 "Days of Wine and Roses"  (Mancini, Mercer) – 2:48
 "Stranger on the Shore" (Acker Bilk) – 2:50
 "Solitaire" (Phil Cody, Neil Sedaka) – 4:22
 "May Each Day"  (Mort Green, George Wyle) – 2:54
 "Can't Take My Eyes Off You"  (Crewe, Gaudio) – 3:43

References

2005 compilation albums
Andy Williams compilation albums